Maurizio Molinari (born 28 October 1964 in Rome, Italy) is an Italian journalist, as of April 2020 Editor in Chief of the daily la Repubblica, after serving five years as editor in chief of la La Stampa.

Education and early career 
Molinari graduated in 1989 with a bachelor's degree in political science from La Sapienza University in Rome, and, in 1993, with degree in history from the same university. He also studied at the Hebrew University of Jerusalem in Israel and at Manchester College, Oxford in the United Kingdom.

At the same time in 1984 he starts working as a journalist for La Voce Repubblicana, the newspaper of the Italian Republican Party, and achieves professional journalist status in 1989.

Molinari lives between New York City and Turin. He is married since 1994 with Micol Braha. They have four children.

Journalist at La Stampa 

Molinari arrives at La Stampa in 1997, and for over a decade he works as correspondent first from Brussels than from New York City, and since 2014 from Jerusalem and Ramallah, before returning to Turin as editor-in-chief in 2016.

Molinari writes also for several Italian newspapers and news magazines, including La Voce Repubblicana, Il Tempo, L'Indipendente, L'Opinione, Il Foglio, and Panorama.

Journalist since 1989 he covered the conflicts in the Balkans, Middle East and Horn of Africa. Among the leaders he interviewed there are the US presidents George W Bush and Barack Obama, the US Secretary of State Condoleezza Rice, Madleine Albright and Henry Kissinger,  the UN Secretary General Kofi Annan and Ban Ki moon, Libyan colonel Qaddafi, Saudi king Abdallah, Israeli prime ministers Netanyahu and Peres, Israeli president Rivlin, PLO chairman Arafat, Palestinian president Abbas, the Pkk commander Ocalan, the Iraqi Kurdish president Barazani and the Turkish President Erdogan.

Molinari is a regular guest commentator on Italian TV, including on La7, Rainews24, TgCom and SkyTg24. He has occasionally been a panelist on CNN, CBS and The NewsHour with Jim Lehrer, aired on the Public Broadcasting Service.

His main reference points are deemed to be Foreign Affairs, Publishing Industry and the History.

Essayist 

Between 2000 and 2022 Molinari has been a prolific essayist, publishing an average of one book per year. Molinari is the author of 21 non-fiction books, all published in Italian: The Jews in Italy: A Problem of Identity (1870-1938) (published by La Giuntina in 1991), The Left and Jews in Italy (1967-1993) (Corbaccio, 1995), The National Interest (Laterza, 2000), Between White House and Botteghe Oscure: Interview with Lamberto Dini (Guerini and Ass, 2001), Wall Street in the Third Millennium (Fondazione Liberal), 2003, No Global? (Laterza, 2003), George W. Bush and the American Mission (Laterza, 2004), Italy Seen by the CIA (1948-2004) (Laterza, 2005), The Jews of New York (Laterza, 2007), Democratic Cowboys (Einaudi 2008),  Obama's Country (Laterza, 2009), The Italians of New York (Laterza, 2011), Shadow Government (Rizzoli, 2012), The Eagle and the Butterfly (Rizzoli, 2013), The Caliphate of Terror (Rizzoli, 2015),  Jihad. Attack to the West (Rizzoli, 2015), "The Return of the Tribes" (Rizzoli 2016), Duel in the Ghetto (Rizzoli, 2017), "Why It Did Happen Here" (Nave di Teseo, 2018), "The West under Assault" (Nave di Teseo, 2019),  "Atlas of a Changing World" (Rizzoli, 2020), “The battlefield” (Nave di Teseo, 2021) and “The Return of Empires” (Rizzoli, 2022).

His "The Caliphate of Terror" (2015) has been presented by Roberto Saviano as the book "we all should read".

Editor in Chief of La Stampa and la Repubblica 
On 26 November 2015 Molinari is nominated new Editor in Chief of the Turin daily La Stampa, replacing , who was heading to Rome to take the place of Ezio Mauro as Editor in Chief of La Repubblica.
The President of EXOR, John Elkann, chooses Molinari over the deputy editor Massimo Gramellini, and flanks him with Massimo Russo (former editor of Wired Italia) as co-director.

In December 2017 Molinari becomes also editorial director of  GNN , the Gedi News Network that includes La Stampa, Secolo XIX and the local papers of the former Finegil Group.
On April 23rd, 2020, he becomes Editor in Chief of la Repubblica.

On 17 July 2021, his newspaper, la Repubblica, had the infamous "Hunt for the non-vaccinated. They are 17 million more" on its front page.

As Editor in Chief, in November 2021 Molinari was attacked by Maria Zakharova, spokeswoman for the Kremlin’s Ministry of Foreign Affairs, because of a news analysis about Putin’s grip on the European Union. "Russian President Vladimir Putin poses a hybrid threat", wrote Molinari, “generating parallel crises to grip the European Union in a vice”. Zakharova called Molinari's analysis “a delicious absurdity”. Decode39 noted that in denying accusations, the Kremlin, confirms its whole line from Ukraine to natural gas.

Participation to Bilderberg and WEF meetings
Maurizio Molinari was a participant of the 2017 Bilderberg Meeting, as noted in the official website of the Bilderberg group, which publishes the list of participants, as well as of the 2019 and 2020 WEF Annual Meeting.

References

External links 
 Official blog
 Jerusalem Day by Day
 The Caliphate of Terror

1964 births
Living people
Italian political writers
Italian newspaper editors
Italian male journalists
Hebrew University of Jerusalem alumni
Alumni of Harris Manchester College, Oxford
Writers from Rome
La Repubblica editors
La Stampa editors
21st-century Italian Jews